The 2020 Manly-Warringah Sea Eagles season was the 71st in the club's history since their entry into the then New South Wales Rugby Football League premiership in 1947. After twenty rounds, the team finished 13th on the NRL Ladder.

COVID-19 Pandemic 
Due to the COVID-19 pandemic, NRL matches were halted after the second round. The Sea Eagles were originally meant to play the New Zealand Warriors and Canberra Raiders in Rounds Three and Four, but the NRL announced an updated draw for those rounds on 15 May that gave the Sea Eagles fixtures against the Canterbury-Bankstown Bulldogs and the Parramatta Eels in those rounds.

Until at least Round Nine, the Sea Eagles will play at Central Coast Stadium in Gosford.

2020 Squad

Signings/Transfers

Gains

Losses

Ladder

Ladder progression 
Numbers highlighted in green indicate that the team finished the round inside the top 8.
Numbers highlighted in blue indicates the team finished first on the ladder in that round.
Numbers highlighted in red indicates the team finished last place on the ladder in that round.

Fixtures

Regular season

Player statistics
Note: Games and (sub) show total games played, e.g. 1 (1) is 2 games played.

References 

Manly Warringah Sea Eagles seasons
Manly Warringah Sea Eagles
Manly Warringah Sea Eagles season